Provincial Finance and Accounts Service / Provincial Civil Service (Finance), often abbreviated to as PFAS or PCS (Finance) is one of the premier Group A state civil service under Executive branch of Government of Uttar Pradesh responsible for Finance Administration of the state.

Recruitment 
The recruitment to the service is made on the basis of an annual competitive examination conducted by Uttar Pradesh Public Service Commission. One-third of PFAS quota is filled by promotion from Audit and Accounting officers' cadre. PFAS officers, regardless of their mode of entry, are appointed by the Governor of Uttar Pradesh.

Responsibilities of PFAS officer 
The officers of the cadre are known for their knowledge, wisdom and integrity; and are considered as watchdogs of the state exchequer. The members of the service working at higher levels of the government set-up render consultation support regarding maintenance of the financial discipline, to the heads of departments or institutions and administrative Secretaries, as the case may be.

The typical functions performed by a PCS (F) officer are:
 Internal Audit, testing of budget estimate, sending it to the department and to ensure that all material purchasing done in the department are in accordance with the financial rules.
 In every department an Accounts Section has been established whose in-charge is the Senior Finance and Accounting Services officer appointed in that department. This Accounts Section provides help to the Head of the Department on financial matters related to that department. 
 Budget Control, proper maintenance of records related to accounts and compliance of financial discipline in the department according to rules indicated in financial hand-book is carried out by Financial Controller appointed in that department.
 To timely send indent for availability of stamps by Treasuries and to ensure availability of adequate quantity of stamps in Treasuries and Sub-Treasuries.

Career progression 
After completing their training, a PFAS officer generally serves as treasury officer at district treasury in the collectorate. After that, they get promoted to the rank of senior treasury officer (STO), and later, chief treasury officer (CTO). Most districts only have one senior treasury officer except those districts which are also divisional headquarters have chief treasury officer heading the district treasury.

After few years of service, they are promoted as Joint Director and thereafter as Additional Director (finance, treasury and pensions) at every divisional level.

In the finance department in state secretariat, PFAS officers serve as special secretaries, joint secretaries and also in some instances as deputy secretaries. The also serve as Finance Officers, directors, additional directors and joint directors in any directorate attached to state finance department such as Directorate of Treasuries, Directorate of Finance, Directorate of Pensions, Directorate of Internal Account Examination and Institute of Financial Management, Training & Research in Lucknow which is staff college for PFAS officers.

Apart from that, they serve as Comptroller in state universities And finance controllers (FC), chief finance and accounts officer (CAO), Senior finance and accounts officer and finance and account officers in all state departments, directorates , autonomous bodies, urban local bodies, panchayati Raj institutions and other agencies.

Salary structure

See also 
 Provincial Civil Service (Uttar Pradesh)
 Provincial Forest Service (Uttar Pradesh)
 Provincial Police Service (Uttar Pradesh)
 Provincial Rural Development Service (Uttar Pradesh)
 Provincial Secretariat Service (Uttar Pradesh)
 Provincial Transport Service (Uttar Pradesh)

References 

Civil Services of Uttar Pradesh
1965 establishments in Uttar Pradesh